The Roman Catholic Diocese of Lins is a diocese located in the city of Lins in the Ecclesiastical province of Botucatu in Brazil.

History
 June 21, 1926: Established as Diocese of Cafelândia from Diocese of Botucatu
 May 27, 1950: Renamed as Diocese of Lins

Bishops

Ordinaries in reverse chronological order
 Bishops of Lins (Roman rite)
 Bishop Francisco Carlos da Silva (2015.09.30 - present)
 Bishop Irineu Danelón, S.D.B. (1987.11.26 – 2015.09.30)
 Bishop Walter Bini, S.D.B. (1984.03.14 – 1987.06.17)
 Bishop Luiz Colussi (1980.10.11 – 1983.12.05)
 Bishop Pedro Paulo Koop, M.S.C. (1964.07.27 – 1980.10.11)
 Bishop Henrique Gelain (1950.05.27 – 1964.03.28)
 Bishops of Cafelândia (Roman Rite) 
 Bishop Henrique Gelain (1948.05.22 – 1950.05.27)
 Bishop Henrique César Fernandes Mourão, S.D.B. (1935.12.16 – 1945.03.30)
 Bishop Ático Eusébio da Rocha (later Archbishop) (1928.12.17 – 1935.12.16)

Coadjutor bishop
Luiz Colussi (1980)

Sources
 GCatholic.org
 Catholic Hierarchy
  Diocese website

Roman Catholic dioceses in Brazil
Christian organizations established in 1926
Lins, Roman Catholic Diocese of
Roman Catholic dioceses and prelatures established in the 20th century